Pragamatic is the third studio album by Praga Khan. It was released in 1998 and featured a new version of "Injected with a Poison".

The Never Records pressing came packaged with a bonus disc titled [R]ejected Tracks containing four Lords of Acid tracks. The second track on this album, "Acid Queen", was originally released in 1988 under the pseudonym Major Problem.

Track listing
 "Luv U Still" – 5:28	
 "Remove the Armour" – 2:50	
 "I Want You" – 3:44	
 "Insanity" – 3:59	
 "Look at Me Now" – 4:28	
 "My Mind Is My Enemy" – 4:11	
 "Injected with a Poison" – 5:06	
 "Independence" – 4:06	
 "City of a Thousand Sins" – 6:36	
 "No Sense At All" – 7:09	
 "Stoned on Your Love" – 4:36	
 "Wasting My Time" – 3:24

[R]ejected Tracks
 "Undress and Possess - Part 2" – 4:54
 "Acid Queen" – 5:44
 "Superstar" – 3:53
 "She and Mrs. Jones (Uncensored Version)" – 4:52

References

1998 albums
Praga Khan albums